Dun is a village in the municipality of Namsos in Trøndelag county, Norway. It is located in the central part of the island of Jøa, and it is the location of Dun Church. Olav Duun was from this village.

The village was the administrative centre of the old Fosnes Municipality until 2020 when it was merged with Namsos.

References

Villages in Trøndelag
Namsos